Ramzi Mohammed (born 18 August 1981) is a Somali national convicted of involvement in the attempted London bombing of 21 July 2005.

Ramzi is currently serving a minimum of 40 years for conspiracy to murder on the Oval Underground station train. He was arrested sharing an apartment with Muktar Said Ibrahim on 29 July 2005, amid allegations that he was the so-called 'bus bomber'. During the arrest, which reportedly culminated in Ramzi and Ibrahim standing near-naked on their balcony to avoid tear gas that police had used,

Later, it was discovered that Ramzi had tried to have the local imam at Muslim Cultural Heritage Centre in North Kensington removed over religious disagreements.  Together with his brother Whabi Mohammad, Ramzi used to set up a table with Islamic literature at local football games.

Arrest and Trial 
His brother Whabi Mohammad was also arrested in a separate raid outside Notting Hill.

In February 2007 he stood trial along with 5 others for his part in the bombings. On 24 January, the court released dramatic video of Ramzi Mohammed attempting to detonate his device. The carriage quickly emptied, apart from one man who stayed behind to reason with him, an off-duty fireman named Angus Campbell.

On 9 July 2007 Ramzi Mohammed was found guilty at Woolwich Crown Court of conspiracy to murder and sentenced to life imprisonment with a minimum term of forty years.

Appeal 
April 2008 the court of appeal judges dismissed a challenge by Ibrahim, Omar, Mohammed and Osman to their convictions.

In December 2014, an appeal to the European Court of Human Rights lodged in 2008 by the bombers claiming that their rights were breached in the 'safety interviews' after their arrests was rejected.

See also 
Muktar Said Ibrahim
Yasin Hassan Omar
Osman Hussain
Manfo Kwaku Asiedu
Adel Yahya

References

External links
Film-clip used as evidence. ; After an unsuccessful detonation Ramzi Mohammed are in discussion with the fireman Angus Campbell. ESD are pulled and he manages to escape from the people trying to catch him at the Oval station. He was later arrested.
BBC ; Report BBC News

Living people
July 2005 London bombings
Somalian emigrants to the United Kingdom
Ethnic Somali people
Islamic terrorism in England
1981 births
Perpetrators of the July 2005 London bombings
Somalian people imprisoned abroad
Somalian Muslims
Prisoners sentenced to life imprisonment by England and Wales
People from Small Heath, Birmingham
Somalian prisoners sentenced to life imprisonment